Hogna thetis is an endemic spider species of the family Lycosidae that lives on Príncipe in São Tomé and Príncipe. It was first described as Lycosa thetis in 1907 by Eugène Simon.

Its female holotype measures 13 mm.

References

Endemic fauna of Príncipe
Lycosidae
Spiders of Africa
Taxa named by Eugène Simon
Spiders described in 1910